Guerra de Titanes (Spanish for "War of the Titans") is a major annual professional wrestling event in Mexico promoted by the Lucha Libre AAA World Wide (AAA) promotion. The show is the "End of year" show and is traditionally held in December with a few exceptions. The first show was held in 1997 and since then twenty three events have been held, the more recent ones presented on pay-per-view while the early shows were shown as television specials on the Televisa channel.

History
The first Guerra de Titanes was held on December 13, 1997, and was shown on pay-per-view (PPV). It was later shown as a television special. Since 1997 Guerra de Titanes has been the "end of the year" show for AAA. All Guerra de Titanes shows have been held in Mexico, with most events (six) being held in Madero, Tamaulipas. The 2004 Guerra de Titanes event holds the record for the largest crowd, with 18,500 spectators. As is tradition with AAA major events the wrestlers compete inside a hexagonal wrestling ring and not the four-sided ring the promotion uses for television events and house shows.

As of 2014 Guerra de Titanes has seen twelve Lucha de Apuestas matches, with eleven people having their hair shaved as a result of losing (El Picudo, Heavy Metal, May Flowers, Polvo de Estrellas, Sangre Chicana, Brazo de Plata, Scorpio Jr., El Brazo, Faby Apache, Vampiro and Pimpinela Escarlata) and two wrestlers being unmasked (Jaque Mate and Super Fly). Guerra de Titanes has seen ten successful title defenses and nineteen title changes over the years. In 2003 the event hosted the "Televisa tag team tournament", the only year it was ever held. In 2015, Guerra de Titanes was scheduled to take place on December 4, but was canceled by AAA a week earlier with no explanation given. It was later announced that it would take place on January 22, 2016.

Dates, venues, and main events

References